Aleksei Viktorovich Selezov (born 27 October 1971) is a former Russian professional footballer.

Club career
He made his debut in the Russian Premier League in 1992 for FC Dynamo Moscow. He played 2 games for FC Dynamo Moscow in the UEFA Cup 1993–94.

Honours
 Russian Premier League bronze: 1992, 1993.

References

1971 births
Footballers from Moscow
Living people
Russian footballers
Association football defenders
FC Dynamo Moscow players
FC Arsenal Tula players
Russian Premier League players